Eulaelaps is a genus of mites in the family Haemogamasidae.

Species
 Eulaelaps arboricola Uchikawa, 1978
 Eulaelaps dremomydis Gu & Wang, 1984
 Eulaelaps feideri (Fain, 1962)
 Eulaelaps heptacanthus Yang & Gu, 1985
 Eulaelaps herbosalis Uchikawa, 1978
 Eulaelaps hirundinis Uchikawa, 1978
 Eulaelaps huzhuensis Yang & Gu, 1985
 Eulaelaps linggangis Wen & Yan, 1985
 Eulaelaps multisetatus Takada, Fujita & Takahashi, 1977
 Eulaelaps onoi Takada, Fujita & Takahashi, 1977
 Eulaelaps oudemansi Turk, 1945
 Eulaelaps petauristae Liu & Ma, 1998
 Eulaelaps pratentis Zhou, 1981
 Eulaelaps silvaticus Uchikawa, 1978
 Eulaelaps silvestris Zhou, 1981
 Eulaelaps sinensis Tian, 1990
 Eulaelaps stabularis (C.L.Koch, 1839)
 Eulaelaps substabularis Yang & Gu, 1986
 Eulaelaps vulgaris Uchikawa, 1978

References

Mesostigmata